The Institute of Tropical Medicine (ITG; , or IMT), officially known as Prince Leopold Institute of Tropical Medicine, is one of the world's leading institutes for training and research in tropical medicine and the organisation of health care in developing countries. Located in Antwerp, Belgium, the ITM also delivers outpatient, clinical and preventive services in tropical pathologies and sexually-transmitted diseases.

Research
The ITM has a strong reputation in biomedical, clinical and public health research, advanced education, travel medicine and care for HIV and sexually-transmitted diseases as well as capacity-building in developing countries. Peter Piot and his colleagues at the institute were the first to demonstrate that AIDS was a tropical African disease. ITM has been recognized by the World Health Organization as a reference centre for AIDS research. ITM also is a national and international reference centre for a series of diseases and pathogens (such as the Ebola virus).

Academics
At ITM, about 450 scientists and technicians do research on pathogens, patients and populations. Yearly, an average of 500 medical doctors, nurses and scientists follow advanced courses. About 120 young researchers are completing their PhD. Each year, the medical services handle around 35,000 consultations.

ITM also carries out an extensive capacity strengthening program in developing countries, and is part of a large network of institutions in Africa, South America and Asia.

Departments
 Department of Biomedical Sciences
 Department of Clinical Sciences 
 Department of Public Health

See also
 Travel medicine
 UNAIDS

References

External links
 Institute of Tropical Medicine

Medical research institutes in Belgium
Tropical medicine organizations
Medical and health organisations based in Belgium
Organisations based in Belgium with royal patronage
Antwerp
Virology institutes